Tomocerus is a genus of springtails described by Nicolet in 1841.

Species
 T. longicornis
 T. minor
 T. reductus
 T. vulgaris

References

Springtail genera